Shacklett is an unincorporated community in Cheatham County, in the U.S. state of Tennessee.

History
A post office called Shacklett was established in 1897, and remained in operation until it was discontinued in 1904. The community was named after Dr. Henry Rector Shacklett, a local physician who lived in the Dog Creek community in the late 1800s.

References

1897 establishments in Tennessee
Unincorporated communities in Cheatham County, Tennessee
Unincorporated communities in Tennessee